Gymnastics was contested at the 1998 Asian Games in IMPACT Hall, Bangkok, Thailand.

Medalists

Men's artistic

Women's artistic

Rhythmic

Medal table

References 

Results

External links 
 Olympic Council of Asia

 
1998 Asian Games events
1998
Asian Games
1998 Asian Games